Jean-Paul Sartre (1905–1980) was a French existentialist philosopher

Sartre may also refer to:
Sartre (surname)
 SARTRE, the Safe Road Trains for the Environment EU technology project
 11384 Sartre, a main-belt asteroid named after the philosopher